The Ukrainian patrol vessel Starobilsk (P191) is an  of the Naval Forces of Armed Forces of Ukraine.

Originally named USCGC Drummond, named for Drummond Island, Michigan for the United States Coast Guard and then upon joining Ukraine, renamed for the town Starobilsk. Drummond was commissioned on 19 October 1988, at Bollinger Shipyard in Lockport, Louisiana, and was last homeported in San Juan, Puerto Rico.

The US Coast Guard's first s were stationed in Florida, replacing Island-class cutters like Drummond.

History

Service in the U.S. Coast Guard 

After commissioning, Drummond served in the U.S. Coast Guard's busiest district and was decorated for her involvement in a variety of operations. In 1992 and 1994, Drummond was awarded the Coast Guard Meritorious Unit Commendation while working with other U.S. Coast Guard and U.S. Navy units that combined for the safe interdiction of over 20,502 Haitian migrants at sea.

Originally homeported in Port Canaveral, Florida, Drummonds home port was changed to Key West in the summer of 2002. Typical patrols in Key West's area of operations involved search and rescue, migrant interdiction operations, fisheries law enforcement, counter narcotics operations, and homeland security. Drummond shifted homeports to Miami Beach in support of the Coast Guard's effort to maximize the operational hours of the patrol boats in the Seventh District by utilizing a dual-crew manning concept.

In April 2004, Drummond again returned to Haiti in support of Operation Able Sentry and Operation Secure Tomorrow as that country's poor political and economic situation generated an exodus of migrants. In 2005, Drummond was again awarded the Coast Guard Meritorious Unit Commendation for her efforts in stemming the illegal flow of Cuban migrants in the Florida Straits. Drummond also was credited for saving more than $500,000 in property during this period in search-and-rescue cases, including a daring rescue of a dismasted sailboat during Tropical Storm Arlene.

After 2004, Drummond was credited with interdicting over 550 illegal Cuban migrants in the Florida Straits, on eight go-fast vessels and 26 homebuilt boats and rafts. Drummond also recovered nearly 120 illegal migrants from various Bahamian islands, working closely with the Royal Bahamas Defence Force. Drummond cared for 1,600 illegal migrants on her decks while conducting 32 politically sensitive repatriations to Cabanas, Cuba.

Transfer to the Ukrainian Naval Forces 

The two vessels were shipped, as deck cargo, and arrived in Odessa on 21 October 2019.

The patrol boat was renamed after the Donbas town Starobilsk. This name perpetuates the memory of two deceased sailors, natives of the namesake town — sailor Olexandr Veremeyenko and senior sailor Stepan Kryl.

References

1988 ships
Island-class patrol boats
Patrol vessels of Ukraine
Ships built in Lockport, Louisiana
Ships involved in the 2022 Russian invasion of Ukraine
Ships of the United States Coast Guard
Ships transferred from the United States Coast Guard to the Ukrainian Navy